8 Days of Christmas is the fourth and penultimate studio album and the first and only Christmas album by American R&B girl group Destiny's Child, released on October 30, 2001 by Columbia Records.

Background 
The album contains twelve tracks featuring traditional Christmas songs and three original songs. Most of them are re-arranged with up-tempo beats in a contemporary R&B style. The album was recorded in Summer 2001 in the United States, but Kelly Rowland stated during the "8 Days of Christmas" video premiere on BET's 106 & Park in Fall 2001 that parts of the album were also recorded in Japan during Destiny's Child's overseas promo tour. In the same interview, Beyoncé revealed, "Actually we wrote the song two years ago when we went in the studio to do some Christmas something. That's what started the idea of doing a Christmas album." The song "8 Days of Christmas" first appeared on the double-disc reissue of The Writing's on the Wall in November 2000.

Critical reception

8 Days of Christmas received generally mixed to positive reviews from critics. Stephen Thomas Erlewine of AllMusic, gave the album 2.5 out 5 stars. In his review, he felt that it did not offer anything different from any other Christmas album and that it had the same formula as every other Christmas album, making it very predictable. Chris Willman of Entertainment Weekly gave the album a B+. He felt that the album had a rough start, stating that song lyrics such as, "a pair of Chloe shades and a diamond belly ring" were too materialistic, leaving a bad taste in your mouth, however, he stated that originals like "Winter Christmas", and "This Christmas" helped the album quickly recover.<ref>{{cite magazine|url=http://www.ew.com/ew/article/0,,253136,00.html|title=Music reviews on MTV TRL Christmas; 8 Days of Christmas; Barbra Streisand's Christmas Memories; NOW That's What I Call Christmas!; Toni Braxton's Snowflakes; They Might Be Giants' Holidayland; Extraordinaire|last=Willman|first=Chris|magazine=Entertainment Weekly|date=November 30, 2001|access-date=March 24, 2018|archive-date=December 12, 2013|archive-url=https://web.archive.org/web/20131212075715/http://www.ew.com/ew/article/0,,253136,00.html|url-status=dead}}</ref> People gave the album a mixed review, stating  that some songs of the album fell short, but despite that, there were a few gifts on the album, such as "Carol of the Bells". They came to the conclusion that while it was good, it was not destined for success. Alexa Camp of Slant Magazine gave the album 2.5 out of 5 stars. She said that the album sounded like a, "Survivor II: Winter Ghetto-chic," and that the album brought little justice to the original songs.

 Commercial performance 8 Days of Christmas'' made its debut on the Billboard 200 at number 59. On the chart issue dated December 22, 2001, it reached its peak at number 34. On December 3, 2001, the album was certified Platinum in 2020 by the  Recording Industry Association of America (RIAA) denoting shipments of 1,000,000 copies.

Track listing 
Credits adapted from the album's liner notes

Notes
 signifies a writer credited as "traditional"
 The album liner notes credit "Silent Night" and "Opera of the Bells" as being written by Beyoncé Knowles.
 The album liner notes credit "O' Holy Night" as being written by Michelle Williams, Erron Williams and Kim Burse.
 signifies a producer and vocal producer

Sample Credits
"8 Days of Christmas" contains re-sung lyrics from Traditional Christmas Carol "The Twelve Days of Christmas" & a replayed element from "Jingle Bells" written by James Pierpont
"Winter Paradise" contains replayed elements from "Father Figure", written & performed by George Michael.
"A 'DC' Christmas Medley" incorporates lyrics from "Santa Claus Is Coming to Town", "Jingle Bells", "Frosty the Snowman", "Have a Holly Jolly Christmas", "Deck the Halls" and "Here Comes Santa Claus".
"Little Drummer Boy" originally performed by The Harry Simeone Chorale and based on "Carol of the Drum" performed by The Trapp Family Singers
"Do You Hear What I Hear?" originally performed by The Harry Simeone Chorale
"White Christmas" originally performed by Bing Crosby
"Platinum Bells" is a semi-remake of "Silver Bells" originally performed by Bing Crosby and Carol Richards
"This Christmas" originally performed by Donny Hathaway
"Opera of the Bells" is a remake of "Carol of the Bells" originally by Ukrainian composer Mykola Leontovych with lyrics by Peter J. Wilhousky.

Personnel
Destiny's Child - vocals performed by (tracks 1-3, 5, 7-8, 10-12)
Asif Ali - recording engineer (track 5)
Pablo Arraya - recording engineer (track 6)
Beyoncé - group member (tracks 1-5, 7-8, 10-12), musical arrangement (4), vocals (performed by) (4)
Derrick Coleman - additional background vocals (sung by) (track 9)
Dylan Dresdow - recording engineer (track 9)
Alan Floyd - musical arrangement (track 6)
David Guerrero - assistant audio mixing (tracks 1, 4-10, 12)
Jaime Guidewicz - assistant recording engineer (track 6)
James Hoover - recording engineer (tracks 2-3)
Solange Knowles - guest vocals (performed by) (track 5)
Tony Maserati - audio mixing (tracks 2-3, 11)
Errol "Poppi" McCalla - music programming 
Bill Meyers - string arrangements, string conductor
Michael Morales - acoustic guitar (track 4)
Ramon Morales - recording engineer (tracks 11-12) 
Tom Morris - recording engineer (tracks 7-8)
John Naslen - recording engineer (track 1)
Flip Osman - assistant audio mixing (tracks 2-3, 11)
Dave "Hard Drive" Pensado - audio mixing (tracks 1, 4-10, 12)
Marius Perron - recording engineer (track 4)
Juan Ramirez - assistant recording engineer (track 5)
Sharay Reed - bass guitar (track 9)
Byron Rickerson - recording engineer (track 9)
Frank Romano - guitar (track 3)
Kelly Rowland - group member (tracks 1-3, 5-8, 10-12), vocals (6)
Motonori Sasaki - assistant recording engineer (track 11)
Stephen Stephanie - assistant recording engineer (track 1)
Larry Strum - recording engineer (track 9)
Brian Summer - assistant recording engineer (track 9)
David Swope - recording engineer (track 6)
Tucker Allen - recording engineer (track 9)
Kevin Turner - acoustic guitar (track 9)
Robert Valdez - assistant recording engineer (track 7-8)
Michelle Williams - group member (tracks 1-3, 5, 7-12), lead vocals (9)

Charts

Weekly charts

Year-end charts

Certifications

Release history

References

2001 Christmas albums
2001 video albums
Albums produced by Focus...
Christmas albums by American artists
Columbia Records Christmas albums
Destiny's Child albums
Destiny's Child video albums
Contemporary R&B Christmas albums
Albums produced by Beyoncé